Sui Shengsheng (born May 30, 1980 in Anshan, Liaoning) is a Chinese volleyball player. He was part of the silver medal-winning team at the 2006 Asian Games.

He competed for Team China at the 2008 Summer Olympics in Beijing.

References
Profile

1980 births
Living people
Olympic volleyball players of China
Sportspeople from Anshan
Volleyball players at the 2008 Summer Olympics
Volleyball players from Liaoning
Asian Games medalists in volleyball
Volleyball players at the 2006 Asian Games
Chinese men's volleyball players
Medalists at the 2006 Asian Games
Asian Games silver medalists for Japan
21st-century Chinese people